Hutt Central, a suburb of the city of Lower Hutt in New Zealand, forms part of the urban area of greater Wellington. It includes the Lower Hutt CBD.

It includes Dowse Art Museum, Lower Hutt War Memorial Library and Lower Hutt Central Fire Station.

Demographics

Hutt Central had a population of 4,176 at the 2018 New Zealand census, an increase of 222 people (5.6%) since the 2013 census, and an increase of 438 people (11.7%) since the 2006 census. There were 1,539 households. There were 2,016 males and 2,157 females, giving a sex ratio of 0.93 males per female, with 651 people (15.6%) aged under 15 years, 756 (18.1%) aged 15 to 29, 1,860 (44.5%) aged 30 to 64, and 903 (21.6%) aged 65 or older.

Ethnicities were 69.1% European/Pākehā, 7.7% Māori, 3.4% Pacific peoples, 25.1% Asian, and 2.6% other ethnicities (totals add to more than 100% since people could identify with multiple ethnicities).

The proportion of people born overseas was 30.3%, compared with 27.1% nationally.

Although some people objected to giving their religion, 45.1% had no religion, 40.0% were Christian, 5.7% were Hindu, 1.1% were Muslim, 1.6% were Buddhist and 1.8% had other religions.

Of those at least 15 years old, 1,173 (33.3%) people had a bachelor or higher degree, and 408 (11.6%) people had no formal qualifications. The employment status of those at least 15 was that 1,695 (48.1%) people were employed full-time, 471 (13.4%) were part-time, and 120 (3.4%) were unemployed.

Education

Public schools

Intermediate education is available in nearby Hutt Intermediate School in Woburn.

It was founded in 1926.

Independent schools

It was founded in 1918.

It was founded in 1912.

It was founded in 1946.

References

Suburbs of Lower Hutt
Central business districts in New Zealand
Populated places on Te Awa Kairangi / Hutt River